Chat Trakan is the northernmost district (amphoe) of Phitsanulok province, central Thailand.

History
Mueang Chat Trakan was an ancient city of the same era as Mueang Nakhon Thai. Originally part of Nakhon Thai District, it was made a minor district (king amphoe) on 1 May 1969, consisting of the two tambon Chat Trakan and Pa Daeng. It was upgraded to a full district on 1 April 1974. It was a scene of conflict in the Thai–Laotian Border War (December 1987 – February 1988.)

Geography
Neighboring districts are (from the southeast clockwise) Na Haeo of Loei province, Nakhon Thai, Wang Thong, Wat Bot of Phitsanulok Province, Thong Saen Khan and Nam Pat of Uttaradit province. And to the east it borders Xaignabouli of Laos.

Chat Trakan lies within the Nan Basin, part of the Chao Phraya Watershed. The Khwae Noi River flows through Chat Trakan, as well as the lesser Kap (Thai: ลำน้ำคับ), Phak (Thai:  ลำน้ำภาค) and Kleung (Thai:  ลำน้ำคลึง) Rivers.

Namtok Chat Trakan National Park is in Chat Trakan District. The northeastern part of the district is in the southernmost prolongation of the Luang Prabang Range mountain area of the Thai highlands.

Administration
The district is divided into six sub-districts (tambons), which are further subdivided into 72 villages (mubans). The township (thesaban tambon) Pa Daeng covers parts of tambons Pa Daeng and Tha Sakae. There are a further six tambon administrative organizations (TAO).

Temples
There are 36 active Buddhist temples in Chat Trakan.

References

External links 
amphoe.com (Thai)
Namtok Chat Trakan National Park

Chat Trakan